Miji, also given the dialect names Sajolang and Dhammai, is a dialect cluster traditionally counted as one of the Sino-Tibetan languages that is spoken in Arunachal Pradesh, northeastern India. The varieties are not particularly close, with only half of the vocabulary in common between the languages of East Kameng District and West Kameng District. Long assumed to be Sino-Tibetan languages, Miji and the recently discovered Bangru language may instead form a small independent language family.

Varieties
There are two divergent varieties of Miji:
Western Miji: spoken in and around Nafra and Thrizino circles, West Kameng District. Western Miji speakers refer to themselves as the Sajalang (sadʑalaŋ) or Dhəmmai (ðəmmai) (Bodt & Lieberherr 2015:70). 
Eastern Miji: spoken in Lada Circle, East Kameng District. Eastern Miji speakers refer to themselves as the Nəmrai (nəmrai) (Bodt & Lieberherr 2015:70).

Bangru (treated in a separate article), sometimes called "Northern Miji", is more divergent.

Distribution
According to Ethnologue, Miji is spoken in the following areas of Arunachal Pradesh.

West Kameng District, Nafra circle, Bichom and Pakesa river valley – 25 villages including Debbing, Ditchik, Rurang, Nachinghom, Upper Dzang, Naku, Khellong, Dibrick, Nizong, Najang, Zangnaching, Chalang, Nafra, and Lower Dzang
East Kameng District: Bameng and Lada circles – Wakke, Nabolong, Kojo, Rojo, Sekong, Panker, Zarkam, Drackchi, Besai, Naschgzang, Sachung, Gerangzing, Kampaa, Salang, Pego, and Dongko villages

I.M. Simon (1979:iii) lists the following Miji villages from the Census of 1971.
1. Chalang [Cinlang] 
2. Díbín [Díbín] 
3. Ditchik [Dícik] 
4. Dzang [Dzang]
5. Jangnachin [Zanachin]
6. Khazolang 
7. Khelong 
8. Laphozu 
9. Mathow 
10. Nakhu
11. Nachibun 
12. Nizung 
13. Rurang

Smaller hamlets include Dishin [Dícin], Devrik [Dívih], Diyung [Diyong], Nazang [Natsang], Nanthalang, and Otung [Uthung]. Some Mijis have also live in Aka villages such as Dijungania, Buragaon, Tulu, Sarkingonia, and Yayung.

Phonology

Consonants
In all Miji varieties the "p" "f" "t" and "k" sounds are always aspirated.

Vowels

Tones
The Miji languages have a relatively simple tonal system with only two tones: high and low. There is a third rising tone but it is so scarcely used that in some of the languages it is disregarded completely.

References

Hrusish languages
Languages of India
Endangered languages of India
Tonal languages